Psammotettix is a genus of true bugs belonging to the family Cicadellidae. The species of this genus are found in Eurasia and North America

Species
The following species are recognised in the genus Psammotettix:

 Psammotettix adriaticus Wagner, 1959 
 Psammotettix agrestis Logvinenko, 1966
 Psammotettix agricola Vilbaste, 1980
 Psammotettix alaicus Dubovsky, 1966
 Psammotettix albomarginatus Wagner, 1941
 Psammotettix alexanderi Greene, 1971
 Psammotettix alexandri Korolevskaya, 1968
 Psammotettix aliena Dahlbom, 1850
 Psammotettix alienulus Vilbaste, 1980
 Psammotettix alimdzhanovi Dubovsky, 1966
 Psammotettix altimontanus Mitjaev, 1969
 Psammotettix amplus DeLong & Davidson, 1935
 Psammotettix amurensis Anufriev, 1976
 Psammotettix angulatus Then, 1899
 Psammotettix arcuatus Ribaut, 1938
 Psammotettix asper Ribaut, 1925
 Psammotettix aspromontanus Poggi, Manti & Castiglione, 2019
 Psammotettix atropidicola Emeljanov, 1962
 Psammotettix atropidis Emeljanov, 1962
 Psammotettix attenuens DeLong & Davidson, 1935
 Psammotettix beirnei Greene, 1971
 Psammotettix cahuilla Van Duzee, 1925
 Psammotettix cephalotes Herrich-Schaeffer, 1834
 Psammotettix cerinus Lindberg, 1948
 Psammotettix comitans Emeljanov, 1964
 Psammotettix confinis Dahlbom, 1850
 Psammotettix correctus Emeljanov, 1972
 Psammotettix crypticus Emeljanov, 1972
 Psammotettix danieli Dlabola, 1971
 Psammotettix dealbatus Emeljanov, 1964
 Psammotettix dentatus Knull, 1954
 Psammotettix diademata Hamilton, 2002
 Psammotettix dubius Ossiannilsson, 1974
 Psammotettix dubovskii Vilbaste, 1960
 Psammotettix emarginata Singh, 1969
 Psammotettix erraticus Linnavuori, 1965
 Psammotettix excavatus Oman, 1931
 Psammotettix excisus Matsumura, 1906
 Psammotettix frigidus Boheman, 1845
 Psammotettix furcatus Logvinenko, 1977
 Psammotettix gracilis Logvinenko, 1971
 Psammotettix greenei Hamilton, 2002
 Psammotettix helvolus Kirschbaum, 1868
 Psammotettix hungaricus Orosz, 1981
 Psammotettix ibericus Remane, 1965
 Psammotettix inexpectatus Remane, 1965
 Psammotettix insulae Lindberg, 1958
 Psammotettix jachontovi Dubovsky, 1966
 Psammotettix jurii Logvinenko, 1977
 Psammotettix kamtshaticus Vilbaste, 1980
 Psammotettix kaszabi Dlabola, 1961
 Psammotettix knullae Greene, 1971
 Psammotettix koeleriae Zachvatkin, 1948
 Psammotettix kolosvarensis Matsumura, 1908
 Psammotettix koreanus Matsumura, 1915
 Psammotettix kublaichani Dlabola, 1967
 Psammotettix kurilensis Anufriev, 1976
 Psammotettix lapponicus Ossiannilsson, 1938
 Psammotettix lividella Zetterstedt, 1840
 Psammotettix maculatus Kuoh, 1985
 Psammotettix majusculus Linnavuori, 1951
 Psammotettix makarovi Moravskaja, 1952
 Psammotettix maritimus Perris, 1857
 Psammotettix mexcala DeLong, 1973
 Psammotettix mongoleriae Dlabola, 1966
 Psammotettix mongolicus Dlabola, 1967
 Psammotettix monticola Dubovsky, 1966
 Psammotettix monticulinus Emeljanov, 1964
 Psammotettix najlae Abdul-Nour, 1986
 Psammotettix nardeti Remane, 1965
 Psammotettix narsikulovi Dlabola, 1960
 Psammotettix nemourensis Matsumura, 1908
 Psammotettix nesiotus Hamilton, 2002
 Psammotettix nodosus Ribaut, 1925
 Psammotettix notatus Melichar, 1896
 Psammotettix orientalior Zachvatkin, 1945
 Psammotettix ornaticeps Horváth, 1897
 Psammotettix pallens Vilbaste, 1980
 Psammotettix pallidinervis Dahlbom, 1850
 Psammotettix parvipenis Remane, 1965
 Psammotettix pelikani Dlabola, 1965
 Psammotettix perpictus Logvinenko, 1978
 Psammotettix pictipennis Kirschbaum, 1868
 Psammotettix poecilus Flor, 1861
 Psammotettix prolongatus Dlabola, 1979
 Psammotettix provincialis (Ribaut, 1925)
 Psammotettix putoni Then, 1898
 Psammotettix queketus Kuoh, 1981
 Psammotettix quettensis Ara & M.Ahmed, 1988
 Psammotettix regularia Singh, 1969
 Psammotettix remanei Orosz, 1999
 Psammotettix revae Knull, 1954
 Psammotettix robustus Emeljanov, 1966
 Psammotettix rudis Emeljanov, 1972
 Psammotettix rupicola Logvinenko, 1965
 Psammotettix sabulicola Curtis, 1837
 Psammotettix salinus Vilbaste, 1980
 Psammotettix salsuginosus Logvinenko, 1961
 Psammotettix saxatilis Emeljanov, 1962
 Psammotettix seriphidii Emeljanov, 1962
 Psammotettix shensis Kuoh, 1981
 Psammotettix shoshone DeLong & Davidson, 1934
 Psammotettix sierraenevadae Dlabola, 1980
 Psammotettix slovacus Dlabola, 1949
 Psammotettix striata Linnaeus, 1758
 Psammotettix striatus 
 Psammotettix stummeri Horváth, 1904
 Psammotettix swatensis M.Ahmed, 1986
 Psammotettix totalus DeLong & Davidson, 1935
 Psammotettix transcaucasicus Dlabola, 1961
 Psammotettix unciger Ribaut, 1938
 Psammotettix vilbastei Dubovsky, 1966
 Psammotettix viridiconfinis Remane, 1965
 Psammotettix viridinervis Ross & Hamilton, 1972
 Psammotettix volgensis Pridantzeva, 1968
 Psammotettix zaisanensis Mitjaev, 1971
 Psammotettix zhangi Yang
 Psammotettix regularia Singh, 1969
 Psammotettix regularia Singh, 1969
 Psammotettix regularia Singh, 1969
 Psammotettix regularia Singh, 1969
 BOLD:AAN8400 (Psammotettix sp.)
 BOLD:ABA5812 (Psammotettix sp.)
 BOLD:ABV4445 (Psammotettix sp.)
 BOLD:ABX3968 (Psammotettix sp.)
 BOLD:ADV4996 (Psammotettix sp.)
 BOLD:ADV4997 (Psammotettix sp.)

References

Cicadellidae
Hemiptera genera